Dana L. Dow is an American politician from Maine. Dow served as a Republican State Senator from Maine's 20th District, where he represented most of Lincoln County, including his residence in Waldoboro. He graduated from the first class of Medomak Valley High School in 1969. He graduated from the University of Southern Maine. He was first elected to the Maine State Senate in 2004. He served a term (2010-12) in the Maine House of Representatives.

In February 2012, Dow sought his old Senate seat following the resignation of David Trahan. He was defeated by Chris Johnson.

He lives in Waldoboro, Maine.

Dana Dow was re-elected to the Maine State Senate in 2016, by defeating incumbent Senator Chris Johnson.  After his reelection in 2018, he was chosen by the Republican senate caucus to be Senate Minority Leader.

He was defeated by then state Representative Chloe Maxmin in November 2020.

References

21st-century American politicians
Living people
Republican Party Maine state senators
Republican Party members of the Maine House of Representatives
Minority leaders of the Maine Senate
People from Waldoboro, Maine
University of Southern Maine alumni
Year of birth missing (living people)